Horrie Toole was an Australian rugby league footballer who played in the 1950s and 1960s. He played in the NSWRFL premiership for North Sydney as a five-eighth, centre and wing.

Playing career
Toole began his first grade career in 1951.  Toole was a member of the North's teams in the 1950s where the club made the preliminary finals in 1952 and 1953 but lost to South Sydney and the semi-finals in 1954 where they lost to St. George.  During his playing career, Toole and teammate George Martin pioneered the design of modern cutaway boots. Toole retired at the end of the 1960 season and remains the club's sixth highest try scorer.

Post playing
After retirement, Toole coached teams at Leeton and Smithtown, and served as a director of North Sydney Leagues Club.

Horrie Toole died in South West Rocks, NSW on 1st January 2023.

References

North Sydney Bears players
Rugby league centres
1931 births
Rugby league players from Sydney
Living people